The 2018 FIBA Under-18 Americas Championship was an international under-18 basketball tournament that was held from 10 to 16 June 2018 in St. Catharines, Ontario, Canada. The eleventh edition of the biennial competition, this is also the qualifying tournament for FIBA Americas in the 2019 FIBA Under-19 Basketball World Cup in Greece.

Hosts selection
On 12 April 2017, FIBA Americas, Canada Basketball and the Niagara Sports Commission announced that the city of St. Catharines will host the 2018 edition of the FIBA U18 Americas Championship. This will be the first time that Canada will host the continental under-18 tournament.

Participating teams 
 North America:
 
  (Hosts)
 Central America/Caribbean: (2017 Central American/Caribbean U17 Championship in Santo Domingo, Dominican Republic - 26–30 July 2017)
 
 
 
 South America: (2017 South American U17 Championship in Lima, Peru - 15–21 July 2017)

Preliminary round
The draw was held on 20 March 2018 in FIBA Americas Regional Office in San Juan, Puerto Rico.

All times are local (UTC-4).

Group A

Group B

Knockout stage

Bracket

Quarterfinals

5–8th place semifinals

Semifinals

Seventh place game

Fifth place game

Third place game

Final

Statistics and awards

Statistical leaders

Points

Rebounds

Assists

Blocks

Steals

Awards

All Tournament Team
 Andrew Nembhard
 Cole Anthony
 Coby White
 Quentin Grimes
 Francisco Cáffaro

Final ranking

References

2018
2018–19 in North American basketball
2018 in Canadian sports
International basketball competitions hosted by Canada
FIBA Under-18